Rootless may refer to:

 System Integrity Protection, a security feature of the operating system macOS, sometimes referred to as rootless.
 Rootless, a mode of operation of an X Window System server.

Music
 Rootless (band), a Japanese rock band.
 "Rootless", a song by Marina and the Diamonds from The Family Jewels.